Ancylistes biacutoides is a species of beetle in the family Cerambycidae. It was described by Stephan von Breuning in 1970.  It is found in Madagascar.

References

Ancylistes
Beetles described in 1970